Marie-Sabine Roger (born 19 September 1957, Bordeaux) is a French writer.

Biography 
Published for the first time in 1989 in youth literature, Marie-Sabine Roger has not stopped writing since, in very varied registers, picture books and story books for children, novels for adolescents and adults, short stories for adults, and more recently, collaboration with scenarios for the cinema, with Jean Becker. For the past few years, she has been targeting mainly adult readers, while continuing to write picture books for very young readers.

Works

Children's literature

Picture books 
 1989: 3 histoires de moutons - Éditions Lito
 1991: 3 histoires d'extraterrestres - Éditions Lito
 1993: Philomène Chontard sorcière ! - Éditions Epigones
 1993: 3 histoires de magicien, de dragons et de sorcière - Éditions Lito
 1994: Un dragon drôlement pénible
 1994: Titoine et tante Ursule
 1994: Titoine Dradeli, fantôme
 1994: L’Inquiétante Madame Crochu
 1994: L’Île du Prince Jamal
 1994: Les Draps de Titoine
 1995: Une souris très enrhumée - Éditions Lito
 1995: Mystères et chuchotis
 1995: Le Vampire de l'abribus
 1995: Le Coup de foudre
 1995: La Fée de juillet
 1995: La Chose du 2e sous-sol
 1996: Zibeline n°1 : Gare à l'ogre
 1996: Voisin rime avec assassin
 1996: Titoine, l'abominable Grignoton
 1996: Titoine, les horribles monstres
 1996: Titebulle et Cailloupatte
 1997: Titoine, quel cirque !
 1998: Petitpain le Lutin
 1998: J’apprends à lire avec les images : Le grand voyage du Roi Minuscule
 1999: Mon papa ne veut pas de chien à la maison
 1999: La Souris des dents
 2000: J’apprends à lire avec les images : La sorcière Sorciflette
 2000: J’apprends à lire avec les images : Le clown Pantoufle est en retard
 2000: Coton, le petit mouton
 2001: Je veux tous mes doudous
 2001: Comment se débarrasser de ses voisins
 2001: Bleu silence
 2002: Un volcan en pétard
 2002: Tanguy l'Azur
 2002: Pitié pour les voleurs !
 2002: Monsieur Noël
 2002: Chocottons d'avoir si trouille
 2002: 1...2...3... Noël !
 1994: Onésime et le diable
 1997: Bon anniversaire Philomène
 1997: Le Piège à fées

Novels 
 1997: Le Vent de la colère - Éditions Hachette
 1997: Le Mystère Esteban - Éditions Hachette
 1998: À la vie, à la... - Éditions Nathan
 1999: Sauve-toi, sauve-nous - Éditions Nathan
 1996: Voisin rime avec assassin
 1997: Les Sources du mal - Éditions Hachette
 1997: Bon anniversaire Philomène
 1997: Le Piège à fées
 1998: Pitié pour les voleurs
 2000: Attention fragiles - Ado
 2000: Dakil le magnifique - Fantasy
 2001: Le Château de Pierre
 2002: La Moitié gauche de la lune - Nouvelles
 2002: La Saison des singes
 2002: Attention fragiles ! - Ado
 2003: Dakil, roi des gnomes - Fantasy
 2004: Le Quatrième Soupirail - Ado
 2004: Le Royaume des reines - Ado
 2004: Une poignée d’argile - Ado
 2007: L’Odyssée de Dakil le Grand - Fantasy
 2008: Et tu te soumettras à la loi de ton père - Éditions Thierry Magnier

Adult literature

Novels 
 2001: Le ciel est immense - Éditions Le Relié
 2004: Un simple viol - Éditions Grasset
 2009: La tête en friche - Éditions du Rouergue (published in English as Soft in the Head, Pushkin Press 2016, translated by Frank Wynne)
 2010: Vivement l’avenir - Éditions du Rouergue
 2012: Bon Rétablissement - Éditions du Rouergue (published in English as Get Well Soon, Pushkin Press 2017, translated by Frank Wynne)
 2014: Trente-six chandelles - Éditions du Rouergue
 2016 : Dans les prairies étoilées - Éditions du Rouergue

Short stories 
 2003: La Théorie du chien perché - Éditions Thierry Magnier
 2007: Les Encombrants - Éditions Thierry Magnier
 2010: Il ne fait jamais noir en ville - Éditions Thierry Magnier

Cinematographic adaptations 
 2010: My Afternoons with Margueritte, movie directed by Jean Becker, with Gérard Depardieu (Germain) and Gisèle Casadesus (Margueritte).
 2014: Get Well Soon, movie directed by Jean Becker, with Gérard Lanvin (Pierre).

Distinctions 
 2006: Prix Sorcières in the adolescent novels category for Le Quatrième soupirail.
 2008: Prix de la nouvelle francophone Nanterre for Les Encombrants (éditions Thierry Magnier)
 2009: Prix Inter-CE for La tête en friche (éditions du Rouergue)
 2009: Cezam Prix Littéraire Inter CE for La tête en friche (éditions du Rouergue)
 2010: Prix Marguerite Audoux for Vivement l'avenir (éditions du Rouergue)
 2011: Prix des lycéens allemands for La tête en friche (éditions du Rouergue)
 2011: Prix littéraire des Hebdos en Région for Vivement l'avenir, éditions du Rouergue)
 2011: Prix Handilivres for Vivement l'avenir (éditions du Rouergue)
 2012: Prix des lecteurs de l'Express for Bon rétablissement (éditions du Rouergue)

External links 
 Marie‐Sabine Roger on MusicBrainz
 Marie-Sabine Roger on Babelio
 Marie-Sabine Roger on Le Choix des libraires
 Marie-Sabine Roger on Éditions Rouergue
 Marie-Sabine Roger on Le Figaro
 Marie-Sabine Roger - Trente-six chandelles on YouTube

1957 births
Living people
20th-century French non-fiction writers
21st-century French non-fiction writers
20th-century French women writers
French children's writers
French women children's writers
French writers of young adult literature
Writers from Bordeaux
21st-century French women writers